Lexington is a town in Greene County, New York, United States. The population was 770 at the 2020 census. The town is in the southwestern part of Greene County.

History 

The area was first settled circa 1788. The town of Lexington was established in 1813, as the "Town of New Goshen", from the town of Windham. Within a few months, the name was altered to "Lexington".

Geography

Lexington is within the Catskill Mountains; most of the town is also inside the Catskill Park Blue Line. The southern town line is the border of Ulster County.

Schoharie Creek flows through the town. The West Kill, an  tributary of the Schoharie, drains much of the town.

Three other Catskill High Peaks—Rusk, North Dome and Sherrill—are also within Lexington.

Demographics

2000
As of the census of 2000, there were 830 people, 375 households, and 219 families residing in the town.  The population density was 10.4 people per square mile (4.0/km2). There were 854 housing units at an average density of 10.7 per square mile (4.1/km2). The racial makeup of the town was 97.35% White, 0.96% Native American, 0.60% Asian, 0.36% from other races, and 0.72% from two or more races. Hispanic or Latino of any race were 1.69% of the population.

There were 375 households, out of which 21.9% had children under the age of 18 living with them, 48.3% were married couples living together, 6.7% had a female householder with no husband present, and 41.6% were non-families. 35.5% of all households were made up of individuals, and 16.8% had someone living alone who was 65 years of age or older. The average household size was 2.21 and the average family size was 2.91.

In the town, the population was spread out, with 20.2% under the age of 18, 4.5% from 18 to 24, 22.9% from 25 to 44, 31.2% from 45 to 64, and 21.2% who were 65 years of age or older. The median age was 47 years. For every 100 females, there were 86.5 males. For every 100 females age 18 and over, there were 96.4 males.

The median income for a household in the town was $29,375, and the median income for a family was $39,583. Males had a median income of $26,250 versus $31,000 for females. The per capita income for the town was $20,471.  About 9.0% of families and 12.9% of the population were below the poverty line, including 15.7% of those under age 18 and 14.0% of those age 65 or over.

Communities and locations in Lexington 
Bushnellsville – A hamlet at the southern town line (in Ulster County) on Route 42.
Lexington – The hamlet of Lexington is located on Route 42.
Mosquito Point – A hamlet west of Lexington village.
North Lexington – A hamlet in the northwestern part of the town.
Spruceton – An  isolated hamlet in the eastern part of the town, on County Route 6.
West Kill – A hamlet south of Lexington village on Route 42.

Hurricane Irene 2011
On August 27, 2011, Hurricane Irene (at that point, a tropical storm) inflicted damage to the town. Very heavy rainfall caused the Schoharie Creek to surge higher and cause immense widespread flooding. High wind speeds were also present. A small bridge was destroyed, and numerous houses were also washed away by the creek. Farms near the creek were flooded as well. Flash flooding also was an issue. Certain roads that run through the town were flooded and some were damaged. Many homes in Lexington lost power.

The Federal Emergency Management Agency arrived in Lexington following the storm. People volunteered for cleanup work and many donated food and clothing. Power was eventually restored to all affected areas.

References

External links

 Town of Lexington official website

Towns in Greene County, New York